William Cramer may refer to:
 William Cramer (pathologist) (1878–1945), German-born pathologist
 William C. Cramer (1922–2003), U.S. Representative from Florida